Silant, an all-wheel drive truck and the only product manufactured by the now defunct Russian company Avtospetsoborudovanie (Ru:Автоспецоборудование) in Velikiy Novgorod, Novgorod Oblast, but now is its own company which manufactures two different 4x4 vehicles.

History
The Silant truck was originally developed by the National Automotive Institute (NAMI) as the 1337/1338/2338. In 2011, 150 vehicles were produced, the plant is designed for an annual production of up to 5,000 units.

Variants
 

Silant vehicles are manufactured in many variants:
 chassis cab,
 "vahtovka" Combination bus, 
 ambulance, 
 volunteer fire brigade vehicle, 
 forest patrol vehicle, 
 mobile police station, 
 "Охотник-I" (Hunter-I) - Expeditionary car for forestry and hunting camps, 
 "Охотник-II (Hunter-II), 
 "vahtovka vodokachalnaya" (for the needs of the utility, MOE, KMG EP polivomoyka)
 refrigerator (freezervehicle) 
 Street cleaner with KMG electric water gun, 
 three-directional tipper, 
 wrecker/tow truck  (WIPO lift-16-01 "Vitebsk lifts"), 
 crane (cranes by Fassi (Italy) with 1-2 tons carrying capacity), 
 Silant ASO 6.5 «tractor» EP (for agriculture, forestry and public utilities with low pressure tires).

Description
All Silants have four-wheel drive, three-person air-conditioned cabs, a   Perkins 1103S-33t three-cylinder turbo diesel, 5-speed manual transmission, power take-off [10], axles from the GAZ-3308 [2] with locking differentials.

6X6 Model
The NAMI-3333 is a 6x6 derivative equipped with  VMTZ D-130T engine and 4-speed gearbox.

See also 

Similar vehicles
 Unimog
 SCAM
 Bremach

Notes

External links
 Silant old official page
 Silant current official page

Defunct motor vehicle manufacturers of Russia
Cars of Russia
Companies based in Veliky Novgorod
Russian brands